Thornlea is a public high school in Thornhill, Ontario, Canada.

Thornlea may also refer to:

 Thornlea, Newfoundland and Labrador, Canada
 Thornlea, South Australia, Australia